Events from the year 1556 in Sweden

Incumbents
 Monarch – Gustav I

Events

 10 January - Breeding farms for cattle and horses are introduced by decree of the monarch.
 25 January - A Russian attack on Viborg is repelled.  
 21 March - Armistice between Sweden and Russia i Käräjäkallio. 
 29 June - Prince John establish himself as the ruler of his Duchy of Finland.

Births

Deaths

References

 
Years of the 16th century in Sweden
Sweden